Jazeera SC is a Somali football club based in Mogadishu, Somalia which currently plays in Somalia League the top division of Somali Football.

History 
Founded as Mogadishu United, the club made its first Somali premier league appearance in 2016/2017 and relegated back to the Somali Division one in the same season. 2019 saw their comeback season to the top tier and manage a 6th place finish retaining their top tier status.

Current squad 

(captain)

References 

Football clubs in Somalia
Somali First Division